"Day of the Dead" is a song by American rap rock band Hollywood Undead. It is the first official single from the band's fourth studio album of the same name. The song was leaked on their Vevo YouTube channel on October 17, and was shortly removed afterwards. It was officially released as the first single on October 21, 2014. The album was released on March 31, 2015. The music video was released onto their Vevo YouTube channel on March 17, 2015

Personnel
Hollywood Undead
Daniel "Danny" Murillo - clean vocals, keyboards, rhythm guitar 
Jordon "Charlie Scene" Terrel - vocals, lead guitar, clean vocals
Jorel "J-Dog" Decker - vocals, unclean vocals, bass guitar, keyboards, synth, programming
George "Johnny 3 Tears" Ragan - vocals, bass guitar
Matthew "Da Kurlzz" Busek - unclean vocals, background vocals, drums, percussion

Chart history

Certifications

References

Hollywood Undead songs
2014 singles
2014 songs
Interscope Records singles